Draka may be:
Draka, Bulgaria, village in Sredets, Burgas Province
Draka Holding N.V., Dutch cable manufacturer
Fictional empire in The Domination series